Alexander Crichlow Barker Jr. (May 8, 1919 – May 11, 1973), known as Lex Barker, was an American actor. He was known for playing Tarzan for RKO Pictures between 1949 and 1953, and portraying leading characters from Karl May's novels, notably as Old Shatterhand in a film series by the West German studio Constantin Film. At the height of his fame, he was one of the most popular actors in German-speaking cinema, and received Bambi Award and Bravo Otto nominations for the honor. After his death, Cheryl Crane the daughter of his ex-wife Lana Turner revealed in her memoirs that he had raped and molested her repeatedly when she was between the ages of 10 and 13.

Early life
Barker was born in Rye, New York, the second child of Alexander Crichlow Barker Sr., a wealthy Canadian-born building contractor and stockbroker, and his American wife, the former Marion Thornton Beals. He had an elder sister, Frederica Amelia "Freddie" Barlow (1917–1980). 

Raised in New York City and Port Chester, New York, he attended the Fessenden School and graduated from Phillips Exeter Academy. He played American football and the oboe. He attended Princeton University, but dropped out to join a theatrical stock company, much to his family's chagrin.

Career

Theatre
Barker made it to Broadway once, in a small role in a short run of Shakespeare's The Merry Wives of Windsor in 1938. He also had a small role in Orson Welles's disastrous Five Kings, which met with so many problems in Boston and Philadelphia that it never made it into New York City.

World War II
In February 1941, 10 months before the attack on Pearl Harbor, Barker left his fledgling acting career and enlisted in the United States Army. He rose to the rank of major during the war. He was wounded in action (in the head and leg) fighting in Sicily. He was awarded the Purple Heart twice.

Early film roles
Back in the US, he recuperated at a military hospital in Arkansas, then upon his discharge from service, traveled to Los Angeles. Within a short time, he landed a small role in Doll Face (1945), his first film.

A string of small roles followed, in films such as Two Guys from Milwaukee (1945) and Cloak and Dagger (1946).

RKO
Barker signed a contract at RKO. He had small roles in The Farmer's Daughter (1947), Crossfire (1947), and Under the Tonto Rim (1947).

Barker went to Paramount for Unconquered (1947). Back at RKO he was in Dick Tracy Meets Gruesome (1947), Berlin Express (1948), Mr. Blandings Builds His Dream House (1948), The Velvet Touch (1948), and Return of the Bad Men (1948), playing Emmett Dalton.

Tarzan
In Tarzan's Magic Fountain (1949), Barker became the tenth official Tarzan of the movies. His blond, handsome, and intelligent appearance, as well as his athletic 6'4" frame, helped make him popular in the role Johnny Weissmuller had made his own for 16 years. His Jane was Brenda Joyce who had been in Weissmuller's last three films.

Barker's second Tarzan was Tarzan and the Slave Girl (1950), where Jane was played by Vanessa Brown. In Tarzan's Peril (1951), Barker's Jane was Virginia Huston, with African location footage. Dorothy Hart was Jane in Tarzan's Savage Fury (1952), directed by Cy Endfield.

Barker got the chance to play a non-Tarzan role in Battles of Chief Pontiac (1952), a Western. He returned to the role one last time in Tarzan and the She-Devil (1953).

Westerns
Barker supported Randolph Scott in Thunder Over the Plains (1953).

At Universal he starred in the Western The Yellow Mountain (1954) and The Man from Bitter Ridge (1955). He went to Columbia to make Duel on the Mississippi (1955).

Barker had a rare non-Western role in The Price of Fear (1956), a film noir with Merle Oberon. He was in the war movie Away All Boats (1956) and the thriller The Girl in the Kremlin (1957).

Barker made two films for Howard W. Koch: War Drums (1957) and Jungle Heat (1957),. He went to 20th Century Fox for The Deerslayer (1957), then did The Girl in Black Stockings (1957).

Italy
In 1957, as he found it harder to find work in American films, Barker moved to Europe (he spoke French, Italian, Spanish, and some German), where he found popularity and starred in over 40 European films, including two movies based on the novels by Italian author Emilio Salgari (1862–1911).

He started his European career with a British thriller The Strange Awakening (1958). He went to Italy to star in Captain Falcon (1959), Son of the Red Corsair (1959), The Pirate and the Slave Girl (1959), and Terror of the Red Mask (1960).

Barker had a short but compelling role as Anita Ekberg's fiancé in Federico Fellini's La Dolce Vita (1960).

He went back to swashbucklers: Knight of 100 Faces (1960), Pirates of the Coast (1960), Robin Hood and the Pirates (1960), and The Secret of the Black Falcon (1961).

Germany
In Germany, he had his greatest success. There he starred in movies based on the "Doctor Mabuse" stories (formerly filmed by Fritz Lang), in the movies The Return of Doctor Mabuse (1961). He was in Doctor Sibelius (1962).

Barker then played Old Shatterhand in an adaptation of the novel by German author Karl May (1842–1912), Treasure of the Silver Lake (1962). It was a huge hit, and 11 movies adapting stories by Karl May followed until 1968. Barker did the comedy Breakfast in Bed (1962), then the adventure movie Storm Over Ceylon (1963). He returned to Italy for The Executioner of Venice (1963) and Kali Yug: Goddess of Vengeance (1963).

Barker reprised his role as Old Shatterhand in Apache Gold (1964), Old Shatterhand (1964) and Last of the Renegades (1965). He went to South Africa for Harry Alan Towers' German-British international co-production Victim Five (1964), then returned to Germany for other adaptations of May books: The Treasure of the Aztecs (1965), The Pyramid of the Sun God (1965) . 24 Hours to Kill (1965) was a British movie. The Hell of Manitoba (1965) and The Desperado Trail (1966) were Westerns.

Though Barker did speak German, he was almost always dubbed in his West German films. His go-to dubber was Gert Günther Hoffmann, whose distinctive voice contributed to Barker's success.

In 1966, Barker was awarded the "Bambi Award" as Best Foreign Actor in Germany, where he was a very popular star. He even recorded two songs in German: "Ich bin morgen auf dem Weg zu dir" ("I'll be on the way to you tomorrow", composed by Martin Böttcher, the composer of some of the soundtracks of the Karl May movies) and "Mädchen in Samt und Seide" ("Girl in Silk and Velvet", composed by Werner Scharfenberger).

Later films included Killer's Carnival (1966), and Winnetou and the Crossbreed (1967). In the same year, he starred in a Eurospy film Spy Today, Die Tomorrow, a horror film The Blood Demon, and appeared in the anthology film Woman Times Seven (1967).

He returned to the United States occasionally and made a handful of guest appearances on American television episodes, but Europe, and especially Germany, was his professional home for the remainder of his life.

Personal life
Barker was married five times:
 Constance Rhodes Thurlow (1918–1975) (married June 27, 1942–divorced 1950), a daughter of Leon Rhodes Thurlow, a vice president of the Decorated Metal Manufacturing Company. They had one daughter, Lynn Thurlow Barker (April 11, 1943 – 2010) and a son, Alexander "Zan" Crichlow Barker III (March 25, 1947 – October 2, 2012). In 1952 Constance Barker married her second husband, John Lawrence Adams, a descendant of John Quincy Adams.
 Actress Arlene Dahl (married 1951–divorced 1952)
 Actress Lana Turner (married September 8, 1953–divorced July 22, 1957). In Detour: A Hollywood Tragedy - My Life with Lana Turner, My Mother (1988), written by Turner's daughter Cheryl Crane, Crane claimed Barker repeatedly molested and raped her from the ages of 10 to 13, and that it was after she informed her mother of this that they divorced. According to Crane, she disclosed the abuse to her former governess Irene Hulley while staying with her grandmother. Hulley informed Crane's grandmother, who in turn summoned Turner to her house. Upon being informed of the abuse by Crane, Turner returned home and held a gun to the sleeping Barker's head but was unable to kill him. The next morning she ordered him out of the house, threatening to call the police if he refused to leave. Barker denied the accusation to Turner, but never addressed the allegations publicly as he died in 1973, 15 years before the publication of Detour.
 Irene Labhardt (married 1957–1962; her death from leukemia), a Swiss actress. They had one son, Christopher (born 1960), who became an actor and singer.
 Tita Cervera (married 1965–divorced 1972, although divorce not deemed legally valid), a Spanish beauty pageant winner. Voted Miss Spain in 1962, she later became the wife of movie producer Espartaco Santoni in 1975 (the marriage turned out to be bigamous) and later still, in 1985, the fifth and final wife of billionaire art collector Baron Hans Heinrich Thyssen-Bornemisza.

Death
Barker died on May 11, 1973, of a heart attack, three days after his 54th birthday, while walking down Lexington Avenue on New York City's Upper East Side, to meet his fiancée, actress Karen Kondazian. The funeral was held in New York. He was cremated and the ashes were taken by his estranged  wife Tita to Spain.

Filmography

Film

Television

Discography
 "Ich bin morgen auf dem Weg zu dir" / "Mädchen in Samt und Seide" 1965, Single, Decca D 19 725
 Winnetou du warst mein Freund 1996, CD, Bear Family Records

See also
 Johnny Weissmuller
 Tarzan
 Jock Mahoney
 Denny Miller
 Buster Crabbe
 Mike Henry (football)

References

Sources

External links

 
 
 Official site in English and German
 Lex Barker at Brian's Drive-In Theater

1919 births
1973 deaths
Male actors from New York (state)
American male film actors
American people of Canadian descent
People from Port Chester, New York
People from Rye, New York
Phillips Exeter Academy alumni
Princeton University alumni
20th-century American male actors
Fessenden School alumni
Purple Heart
American expatriate actors in Germany
Deaths from coronary artery disease